The 1995 Lao League was the sixth season of top flight football in Laos. Pakse FC and Education Team FC won the championships. The tournament won by Pakse was apparently a tournament from which teams from Vientiane were excluded and Education Team won a separate tournament exclusively for teams from Vientiane.

References

Lao Premier League seasons
Laos
Laos
1